Bathiorhamnus is a genus of flowering plants belonging to the family Rhamnaceae.

Its native range is Madagascar.

Species:

Bathiorhamnus capuronii 
Bathiorhamnus cryptophorus 
Bathiorhamnus dentatus 
Bathiorhamnus louvelii 
Bathiorhamnus macrocarpus 
Bathiorhamnus reticulatus 
Bathiorhamnus vohemarensis

References

Rhamnaceae
Rhamnaceae genera
Taxa named by René Paul Raymond Capuron